Kreda may refer to:

 Kreda, a clan of the Daza people of North Africa
 Kréda (horse), a variant of the Dongola horse breed
 Lake Kreda, a lake in Slovenia
 Kreda, a word in some Slavic languages referring to chalk or to the Cretaceous

See also 
 Creda